Zywave, Inc. is a software company headquartered in Milwaukee, Wisconsin that provides software as a service (SaaS) products for insurance brokers and financial planners. Insurance product categories include agency management, data analysis, compliance, risk management and marketing tools, while its financial division produces planning tools primarily for wealth management. Following acquisitions in 2010 and 2011, Zywave now commands the largest market share for personal financial planning software. Its customer base contains more than 350,000 professional users across North America. Zywave also has offices in Carlsbad, California and Winnipeg, Canada.

History
Zywave was founded in 1995 by individuals at a regional insurance brokerage, Frank F. Haack & Associates, (later part of Willis) in Milwaukee, Wisconsin, who developed the products as customer service tools. They shared the software with other brokers in industry networking groups like Assurex Global and Intersure. The company then completely separated from Frank F. Haack in 2004. In 2008, Zywave entered into a strategic investment partnership with Vista Equity Partners, a San Francisco private equity firm. In 2010, Zywave announced the acquisition of Specific Software Solutions, a provider of workers' compensation software, and in 2011, Zywave acquired financial planning software developer Emerging Information Systems, Inc.

The name "Zywave" was inspired by the axes and shape of a data graph.

Awards
 Inc. 5000 honoree, 2007 and 2008 
 BenefitsPro Readers' Choice Awards 2006
 Top Workplaces in Southeastern Wisconsin 2013

References 

Companies based in Milwaukee
Software companies based in Wisconsin
Software companies of the United States
Software companies established in 1995
1995 establishments in Wisconsin